Puma SE, branded as PUMA, is a German multinational corporation that designs and manufactures athletic and casual footwear, apparel and accessories, which is headquartered in Herzogenaurach, Bavaria, Germany. Puma is the third largest sportswear manufacturer in the world. The company was founded in 1948 by Rudolf Dassler (1898–1974). In 1924, Rudolf and his brother Adolf "Adi" Dassler had jointly formed the company  ('Dassler Brothers Shoe Factory'). The relationship between the two brothers deteriorated until they agreed to split in 1948, forming two separate entities, Adidas and Puma.

Following the split, Rudolf originally registered the newly established company as Ruda (derived from Rudolf Dassler, as Adidas was based on Adi Dassler), but later changed the name to Puma. Puma's earliest logo consisted of a square and beast jumping through a D, which was registered, along with the company's name, in 1948. Puma's shoe and clothing designs feature the Puma logo and the distinctive "Formstrip" which was introduced in 1958.

History

Background
Christoph von Wilhelm Dassler was a worker in a shoe factory, while his wife Pauline ran a small laundry in the Franconian town of Herzogenaurach,  from the city of Nuremberg. After leaving school, their son, Rudolf Dassler, joined his father at the shoe factory. When he returned from fighting in World War I, Rudolf was trained as a salesman at a porcelain factory, and later in a leather trading business in Nuremberg.

In 1924, Rudolf and his younger brother, Adolf, nicknamed "Adi", founded a shoe factory. They named the new business "Gebrüder Dassler Schuhfabrik" (Dassler Brothers Shoe Factory) which was the only business at the time that manufactured sports shoes. The pair started their venture in their mother's laundry. At the time, electricity supplies in the town were unreliable, and the brothers sometimes had to use pedal power from a stationary bicycle to run their equipment. In 1927, they moved into a separate building.

The brothers drove from Bavaria to the 1936 Summer Olympics in Berlin with a suitcase full of spikes and persuaded United States sprinter Jesse Owens to use them, the first sponsorship for an African American. Owens won four gold medals. Business boomed; the Dasslers were selling 200,000 pairs of shoes annually before World War II.

Both brothers joined the Nazi Party, but Rudolf was a keen Nazi, who applied to join, and was accepted into the Gestapo; they produced boots for the Wehrmacht. A growing rift between the brothers reached a breaking point during a 1943 Allied bomb attack. Adi and his wife climbed into a bomb shelter that Rudolf and his family were already in. "Here are the bloody bastards again," Adi remarked, apparently referring to the Allied war planes, but Rudolf, due to his apparent insecurity, was convinced his brother meant him and his family. When Rudolf was later picked up by American soldiers and accused of being a member of the Waffen SS, he was convinced that his brother had turned him in.

Split and creation of Puma 
After increasingly different views of how to run the business, the brothers split the business in 1948. Rudolf moved to the other side of the Aurach River to start his own company. Adolf started his own company using a name he formed using his nickname—Adi—and the first three letters of his last name—Das—to establish Adidas. Rudolf created a new firm that he called "Ruda", from "Ru" in Rudolf and "Da" in Dassler. A few months later, Rudolf's company changed its name to Puma Schuhfabrik Rudolf Dassler.

Puma and Adidas entered a fierce and bitter rivalry after the split. The town of Herzogenaurach was divided on the issue, leading to the nickname "the town of bent necks"—people looked down to see which shoes strangers wore.

In the first football match after World War II in 1948, several members of the West Germany national football team wore Puma boots, including the scorer of West Germany's first post-war goal, Herbert Burdenski. Rudolf developed a football boot with screw-in studs, called the "Super Atom" in collaboration with people such as West Germany's national coach Sepp Herberger.

Olympic presence 
At the 1952 Summer Olympics, 1500 metres runner Josy Barthel of Luxembourg won Puma's first Olympic gold in Helsinki, Finland.

At the 1960 Summer Olympics, Puma paid German sprinter Armin Hary to wear Pumas in the 100-metre sprint final. Hary had worn Adidas before and asked Adolf for payment, but Adidas rejected this request. The German won gold in Pumas but then laced up Adidas for the medals ceremony, to the shock of the two Dassler brothers. Hary hoped to cash in from both, but Adi was so enraged he banned the Olympic champion.

During the 1968 Olympics Black Power Salute, Puma-sponsored African-American athletes Tommie Smith and John Carlos, after having won gold and bronze in the 200 meters, respectively, took to the podium with their Puma Suedes in hand and bowed their heads and raised their black-gloved fists in silent protest during the playing of the national anthem, an act meant to stand up for human rights and to stand up for black Americans.

A few months prior to the 1970 FIFA World Cup, Armin Dassler (Rudolf's son) and his cousin Horst Dassler (Adi's son) sealed an agreement which was dubbed "The Pelé pact". This agreement dictated that soccer player Pelé would be out of bounds for both Adidas and Puma. However, Pelé complied with a request by Puma's representative Hans Henningsen to increase the awareness and profile of Puma after he received $120,000 to wear the Formstrips. At the opening whistle of a 1970 World Cup finals match, Pelé stopped the referee with a last-second request to tie his shoelaces before kneeling down to give millions of television viewers a close-up of his Puma shoes. This outraged Horst, and future peace agreements were called off.

During the 1972 Summer Olympics, Puma provided shoes for the Ugandan 400 metres hurdles champion, John Akii-Bua. After Akii-Bua was forced out of Uganda by its military government, Puma employed him in Germany. Eventually, Akii-Bua returned to Uganda.

Puma launched the Clyde in 1973; designed for basketball player Walt "Clyde" Frazier, it gained wide popularity.

Going public 
Puma became a public company in 1986, and thereafter was listed on the Börse München and Frankfurt Stock Exchange; its first profit since the IPO was registered in 1994. In May 1989, Rudolf's sons Armin and Gerd Dassler sold their 72 percent stake in Puma to Swiss business Cosa Liebermann SA. The company acquired Scandinavian Tretorn Group in 2001, later sold to Authentic Brands Group in 2015. For the fiscal year 2003, the company had revenue of €1.274 billion, and majority shareholder Monarchy/Regency sold its shareholdings to a broad base of institutional investors.

In February 2007, Puma reported that its profits had fallen by 26% to €32.8 million ($43 million; £22 million) during the final three months of 2006. Most of the decline in profits was due to higher costs linked to its expansion; sales rose by more than a third to €480.6 million. In early April, Puma's shares rose €29.25 per share, or about 10.2%, to €315.24 per share. On 10 April, the French conglomerate PPR (which became Kering in 2013) announced that it had bought a 27% stake in Puma, clearing the way for a full takeover. The deal valued Puma at €5.3 billion. PPR said that it would launch a friendly takeover for Puma, worth €330 a share, once the acquisition of the smaller stake was completed. The board of Puma welcomed the move, saying it was fair and in the firm's best interests. As of July 2007, PPR owned over 60% of Puma stock.

In 2008, Melody Harris-Jensbach was appointed deputy chief executive officer; designer and artist Hussein Chalayan became creative director, and Puma acquired a majority stake in Chalayan's fashion business.

2010 onward 

In 2010, Puma acquired Cobra Golf, and took over bodywear and socks company Dobotex the following year. In July 2011, the company completed a conversion from an Aktiengesellschaft (German public limited company) to a Societas Europaea, the European Union-wide equivalent, changing its name from Puma AG Rudolf Dassler Sport to Puma SE. At the same time,  replaced the long-serving Jochen Zeitz as the firm's chief executive officer (CEO), with Zeitz becoming chairman. The company has been led by former football professional Bjørn Gulden since 1 July 2013. Arne Freundt was appointed CEO in November 2022.

Finances 

Puma has been a public company since 1986, listed on the Frankfurt Stock Exchange. French luxury group Kering (formerly known as PPR) holds 9.8%, Kering's largest shareholder Groupe Artemis owns 29% of the share capital. Since 1 July 2013, the company has been led by former football professional Bjørn Gulden (chief executive officer).

Puma ranks as one of the top shoe brands with Adidas and Nike, and employs more than 18,000 people worldwide. The company has corporate offices around the world, including four defined as "central hubs": Assembly Row, Somerville, Massachusetts; Hong Kong; Ho Chi Minh City, Vietnam; and global headquarters in Herzogenaurach, Germany.

Sponsorships

Puma offers products for football, basketball, running, training and fitness, golf, motorsports, and athleisure. It has sponsored a number of athletes, including Pelé, Eusébio, Johan Cruyff, Diego Maradona, Lothar Matthaus, Clyde Frazier, Jim Hines, Boris Becker, Martina Navratilova, Tommie Smith, Joe Namath, Linford Christie, Colin Jackson, Heike Drechsler, and Michael Schumacher.

International footballers Neymar, Gianluigi Buffon, Sergio Agüero, Antoine Griezmann, Marco Reus, Raphael Varane, Luis Suárez, David Silva, Vincent Kompany, Christian Pulisic, Yann Sommer, Jonas Hofmann and more sport Puma football boots.

Puma holds a 5% stake of German football club Borussia Dortmund, and has been its supplier since 2012. In 2014, Puma and Arsenal Football Club entered a 5-year merchandising partnership, the biggest deal in Puma and Arsenal's history. The partnership ended in 2019. Other football clubs include Manchester City F.C., Barrow AFC, Olympique de Marseille, Fenerbahçe S.K., Sociedade Esportiva Palmeiras, Borussia Mönchengladbach, Lillestrøm SK, Valencia CF, AC Milan, Peñarol, US Sassuolo, Club de Fútbol Monterrey, Bengaluru FC, Chennaiyin FC, Mumbai City FC and many others. National football teams include Iceland, Switzerland, Austria, Morocco, Egypt, and Uruguay. Puma is also the main sponsor of the Israel Football Association (IFA) and is currently a focus of the Palestinian Boycott, Divestment and Sanctions movement. The IFA, with sponsorship from Puma and other companies, operates from settlements, as does Puma itself via its past and present licensees in Israel.

In athletics (track and field), Puma sponsors the athletic associations for Brazil (CBAt), Jamaica (JAAA), Cuba (FCA), The Bahamas (BAAA), Grenada (GAA), Trinidad & Tobago (NAAATT), Dominica (DAAA), Barbados (AAB), Portugal (FPAtletismo), Switzerland (Swiss Athletics), and Norway (NFIF). It also has the world's fastest man, Jamaican track athlete Usain Bolt, under contract along with other track and field athletes like Andre De Grasse, Karsten Warholm, and Gianmarco Tamberi. Several world records were achieved by athletes wearing Puma shoes, such as Heinz Futterer (1954), Armin Hary (1960), Jim Hines (1976), Tommie Smith (1968), Asafa Powell (2015), and Usain Bolt (2002).

In 2018, Puma announced its entrance back into basketball after a break of almost 20 years, and appointed Jay-Z as the division's creative director. Marvin Bagley III, Deandre Ayton, Zhaire Smith, and Michael Porter Jr. are the first players to join Puma's basketball roster and play in performance Puma basketball shoes. In December 2021, the brand launched High Court, its first women's basketball line, designed by creative director June Ambrose.

Puma made its partnership with netball after 28 years by sponsoring the Melbourne Vixens in 2018, and became the official apparel sponsor of New Zealand's national netball team, the Silver Ferns. The firm sponsors Indian cricketer Virat Kohli, the former captain of the India cricket team. Golfers such as Rickie Fowler, Bryson DeChambeau and Lexi Thompson are equipped by Puma's golf brand Cobra Golf.

Puma is the main producer of enthusiast driving shoes and race suits and entered a partnership with BMW, Ducati and Ferrari to make their respective shoes. In Formula 1, Puma equips the teams of Mercedes AMG Petronas, Scuderia Ferrari, Red Bull Racing, and Alfa Romeo. It also sponsors BMW and Porsche in all of their Motorsports activities. In NASCAR, Puma equips Team Penske with fire suits, gloves, and shoes.

Rihanna was named creative director of Puma's womenswear line in December 2014. Two years later, Puma partnered with The Weeknd as a creative collaborator. In 2018, Puma launched its venture with its ambassador Selena Gomez called "Phenom Lux''

Labour practices and factory conditions
In 2000, Puma began auditing all of its suppliers on a yearly basis, and makes the results available in its sustainability reports. Since 2005, it has publicly provided a list of its suppliers.

In August 2004, a joint report from the National Labor Committee and China Labor Watch stated that workers at some of Puma's Chinese factories were enduring sweatshop conditions, working up to 16.5 hours per day for about US$0.31 an hour. Puma said it would investigate the claims.

In February 2012, a woman who worked for one of Puma's suppliers in Cambodia was shot during a protest over factory working conditions. Puma acknowledged the poor working conditions and said it would work to improve the situation.

According to a joint report from Labour Behind the Label and Community Legal Education Centre, 30 workers fainted in November 2012 while producing clothing for Puma in China. The faintings were caused by excessive heat and alleged forced overtime. In 2014, almost 120 workers fainted in two Cambodian clothing factories where sportswear was being produced for Puma and Adidas, due to temperatures above . In March 2017, 150 workers assembling Puma products in Cambodia fainted due to thick smoke.

Puma has obtained the Ethical Clothing Australia accreditation for its Australian-made products. This labour-friendly accreditation applies to only a small percentage of Puma's total production.

In 2020, the Australian Strategic Policy Institute accused at least 82 major brands, including Puma, of being connected to forced Uyghur labor in Xinjiang. In 2022, researchers from Nordhausen University of Applied Sciences identified cotton from Xinjiang in Puma shirts.

Environmental practices
In May 2011, English newspaper The Guardian stated that Puma was the "world's first major company to put a value on its environmental impact" and that Puma "has made a commitment that within four years, half its international collections will be manufactured according to its internal sustainability standard, by using more sustainable materials such as recycled polyester, as well as ensuring its suppliers develop more sustainable materials and products."

Puma is also known for boosting positive environmental practices in its supply chain through financial incentives. The supply chain finance scheme implemented links the sustainability performance of key suppliers to the costs at which they can access finance. The system won the company an "Innovation Award" in Supply Chain Finance in 2016.

See also
List of Puma sponsorships

References

Bibliography

External links

 

 
1980s fashion
1990s fashion
2000s fashion
2010s fashion
1980s initial public offerings
Athletic shoe brands
Clothing brands of Germany
Clothing companies established in 1924
Companies in the MDAX
Companies based in Bavaria
Companies based in Herzogenaurach
Companies listed on the Frankfurt Stock Exchange
German companies established in 1924
Multinational companies headquartered in Germany
Shoe companies of Germany
Skateboard shoe companies
Sporting goods manufacturers of Germany
Sportswear brands
Swimwear manufacturers